Mjólkursamsalan, (MS) is an Icelandic company that produces milk and other dairy products and is the largest company in the Icelandic dairy industry  MS is owned by two cooperatives, Auðhumla a cooperative of Icelandic dairy farmers and Kaupfélag Skagfirðinga a cooperative founded in 1889 in Sauðárkrókur. 

MS was formed in the 1990s to reduce cost of production. Its oldest constituent is Mjólkursamlag KEA, a dairy cooperative founded in 1927. It has about 90% share of the Icelandic milk market, and has an ongoing dispute with the Icelandic competition authority regarding a legal provision in a special law dealing with the dairy industry.

References 

Agricultural organizations based in Iceland
Dairy products companies
Food and drink companies of Iceland
1935 establishments